Bergrheinfeld is a municipality in the district of Schweinfurt in Bavaria, Germany.

Economy
Boll KG is headquartered in Bergreinfeld.

References

External links
  

Schweinfurt (district)